Nazario Sauro (S 518) was the lead boat of thes of the Italian Navy.

Construction and career
Nazario Sauro was laid down at Fincantieri Monfalcone Shipyard on 26 June 1974 and launched on 9 October 1976. She was commissioned on 1 March 1980.

She was decommissioned on 30 April 2002. The submarine's disarmament started on 1 May 2002 as she was moored at the Arsenal of La Spezia together with the sister submarine Carlo Fecia di Cossato, where she has been, since 2008, the subject of a restoration work for the transformation into a museum was implemented on behalf of the Institution of the Sea and Navigation Museums of Genoa, by the Fincantieri company, the same company that had built her in the late 1970s (then Italcantieri).

At dawn on 18 September 2009 the Nazario Sauro left the La Spezia for her last voyage. Towed by tugs, she reached the ancient port of Genoa where on 26 September she was moored in the Port of Genoa in front of the Galata Museum of the sea.

The museum exhibition, designed and directed by the architect Roberto Bajano for the Galata - Sea Museum in collaboration with the Submarine Project Office of the Military Ships Directorate of Fincantieri, makes her the first museum ship in Italy visible in the water.

The opening to the public took place on 29 May 2010.

Gallery

See also 
 Enrico Toti (S 506)

Citations

External links
 

1976 ships
Sauro-class submarines
Ships built by Fincantieri
Museum ships in Italy